Donovan Malcolm (born 12 January 1959) is a Jamaican cricketer. He played in one List A and eight first-class matches for the Jamaican cricket team from 1980 and 1982.

See also
 List of Jamaican representative cricketers

References

External links
 

1959 births
Living people
Jamaican cricketers
Jamaica cricketers
Place of birth missing (living people)